The Bangladesh Open University or BOU is a public university with its main campus in Board Bazar, Gazipur District, Dhaka Division. It is the 8th largest university in the world according to enrolment.

The university was established on 21 October 1992. As the only public university in Bangladesh to use distance education as a method of delivery, BOU is mandated to "promote through multimedia; instruction of every standard and knowledge – both general and scientific – by means of any form of communications technology, to raise the standard of education and to give the people educational opportunities by democratizing education and creating a class of competent people by raising the standard of education of the people generally."

Administration

History

Distance education was first introduced into Bangladesh when the Education Directorate was assigned with the responsibility for distribution of 200 radio receivers to educational institutions. This led to the creation of an Audio-Visual Cell and later the Audio-Visual Education Centre (AVEC) in 1962.

Upon achieving independence in 1971, mass education was viewed as a priority in the new nation. The School Broadcasting Programme (SBP) was launched in 1978. The project was later expanded to become the National Institute of Educational Media and Technology (NIEMT) in 1983. In 1985, the NIEMT was renamed the Bangladesh Institute of Distance Education (BIDE) which offered, apart from audio-visual materials, a Bachelor of Education (BEd) programme via distance learning validated by the University of Rajshahi. The success of BIDE encouraged policymakers to take up a major plan for establishing an open university.

In 1992, the plan came into fruition with the tabling and passing of the BOU Act 1992 and Prime Minister was the chancellor of the Bangladesh Open University. On 22 June 2009, a bill was placed in the parliament to assign the president as chancellor replacing the prime minister.

List of vice-chancellors 

 Professor Dr. Syed Humayun Akhter (present)
 Professor Dr. M. A. Mannan (2012 to 2021)

Academics

BOU offers two types of programmes, formal and non-formal, in seven schools and a network of 12 regional resource Centres, 80 co-ordinating offices and 1,000 tutorial centres nationwide.

Study programmes

A total of 21 formal academic programmes are offered by BOU. Formal programmes are academic programmes that result in the awarding of an academic qualification up to a master's degree upon completion and examination.

As low rate of literacy remains an issue in Bangladesh, non-formal programmes are conducted by the BOU to create awareness and impart knowledge about health, environment, disaster management, basic science, agriculture, food, nutrition and other branches of knowledge for human development. To date, 19 non-formal programmes have been initiated in the areas of environmental protection, basic science, elementary mathematics, agriculture, bank services, marketing management, health, nutrition, population and gender issues.

Faculties

BOU's 11 divisions are organized into six schools:

School of Education (SoE)
Programs offered:                                                                                                                                                                                                                                                                                                                                               
 Bachelor of Education (BEd)
 Master of Education (MEd)
 Certificate in Education (CEd)

School of Social Science, Humanities & Languages (SSHL)
Programs offered:
 Master of Arts (MA)/ Master of Social Science (MSS) (Preliminary)
 Master of Arts (MA)/Master of Social Science (MSS) (Final)
 Bachelor of Law (Hons) LLB (Honours) 
 Bachelor of Arts (Honours)/ Bachelor of Social Science (Honours) : 
 a) Bangla, 
 b) Political Science
 c) Economics
 d) Sociology
 e) English Language and Literature 
 f) History
 g) Islamic History and Culture and other subjects.
 Bachelor of Arts (BA)/Bachelor of Social Science (BSS)
 Bachelor of English Language Teaching (BELT)
 Certificate in Arabic Language Proficiency (CALP)
 Certificate in English Language Proficiency (CELP)

School of Business (SoB)
Programs offered:
 Bachelor of Business Administration (BBA)
 Master of Business Administration (MBA)
 Evening Master of Business Administration (EMBA)
 Commonwealth Executive MBA (CEMBA)
 Commonwealth Executive MPA (CEMPA)
 Post Graduate Diploma in Management (PGDM)
 Certificate in Management (CIM)

School of Agriculture & Rural Development (SARD)
Programs offered:
 Bachelor of Agricultural Education (B. Ag. Ed)
 Master of Science (MS) in 7 Subjects:
 a) MS in Agronomy
 b) MS in Entomology
 c) MS in Soil Science
 d) MS in Irrigation and Water Management (IWM)
 e) MS in Aquaculture
 f) MS in Poultry Science
 Diploma in Youth in Development Work (DYDW)
 Certificate in Livestock & Poultry (CLP)
 Certificate in Pisciculture & Fish Processing (CPFP)
Upcoming
 Bachelor of Science (BSc.) in Agriculture
 Bachelor of Science (BSc.) in Fisheries

School of Science & Technology (SST)
Programs offered:
 Bachelor of Science in Computer Science and Engineering (B.Sc. in CSE) -Engineering Degree
 Master of Disability Management and Rehabilitation (MDMR) -for MBBS Doctors
 Master of Public Health
 Post Graduate Diploma in Medical Ultrasound (PGDMU) -for MBBS Doctors
 Diploma in Computer Science and Application (DCSA)
Upcoming
 Bachelor of Science in Electronics and Communication Engineering (B.Sc. in ECE)
 Bachelor of Science in Pharmacy (B.Pharm.)
 Master of Science (M.Sc.) in Software Engineering (MSSE)

Open School
Programs offered:
 Master of Business Administration (MBA) in Bangla language
 Masters in Criminology and Criminal Justice
 Bachelor of Business Administration (BBA) in Bangla language
 Bachelor of Business Studies (BBS)-3 years duration
 Secondary School Certificate (SSC)
 Higher Secondary Certificate (HSC)

A full list of the regional resource centres and tutorial centres affiliated with BOU can be found from BOU's website.

Accreditation

BOU is granted the authority to confer degrees under Clause 6(c) of the BOU Act 1992. BOU is recognised as a national university by the University Grants Commission of Bangladesh, a statutory body attached to the Ministry of Education.

The BOU is a founding and participating institution of the SAARC Consortium on Open and Distance Learning (SACODiL).

Clubs of University
 Bangladesh Open University Computer Club (BOUCC)
 Open University Programming Club
 Open University Computer Society- OUCS
 Open University Students Union of SST (OUSUS)

References

External links
 Bangladesh Open University
 School of Science & Technology (SST, BOU) 
 Bangladesh Open University Computer Club (BOUCC)

Educational institutions established in 1992
Bangladesh Open University
1992 establishments in Bangladesh
Distance education institutions
Organisations based in Gazipur
Universities and colleges in Gazipur District
Distance education institutions based in Bangladesh
Open universities